Park Broom is a hamlet in the civil parish of Stanwix Rural, in the Carlisle district, in the county of Cumbria, England. It is a few miles away from the small city of Carlisle and near the River Eden. It was formerly in the township of Linstock.

Nearby settlements 
Nearby settlements include the commuter village of Houghton and the hamlets of Brunstock, Walby and Linstock.

Transport 
For transport there is the A689 about a quarter of a mile away, the B6264 about a mile away and the M6 motorway nearby. There is also Carlisle railway station a few miles away, which is on the Settle-Carlisle Line.

References 

 A-Z Carlisle

Hamlets in Cumbria
City of Carlisle